The Te Manatū Waka Ministry of Transport is the public service department of New Zealand charged with advising the government on transport policy.

History
The Ministry was established in 1968 with a merger of the then Transport Department and the Civil Aviation Department. In the 1970s, the roles of the Ministry included traffic enforcement, air traffic control, weather forecasting, air accident investigation and lighthouses. Many of these functions were divested to other government organisations over the period from 1988 to 2004.

The Ministry of Transport was formerly responsible for enforcement of traffic laws before their division of traffic officers was merged into the same organisation as the police in 1992.

Government transport sector
The transport sector includes four Crown entities and three State-owned enterprises:

Crown Entities
 Civil Aviation Authority (CAA), includes the Aviation Security Service (AvSec)
 Maritime New Zealand (MNZ)
 New Zealand Transport Agency (NZTA)
 Transport Accident Investigation Commission (TAIC)
State-Owned Enterprises
 Airways Corporation of New Zealand Limited (Airways New Zealand)
 Meteorological Service of New Zealand Limited (MetService)
 New Zealand Railways Corporation (NZRC) (trading as KiwiRail)

They are responsible for day-to-day hands-on management of daily traffic, aviation, rail and maritime activities. Their roles and the composition of their boards are defined in legislation.

The Ministry negotiates an annual performance agreement with each entity on behalf of the Minister, monitors the entities' performance against that agreement, and recommends appointments to the entities' governing bodies.

The Ministry provides policy advice to the Minister, in collaboration with the Crown entities, including the making of transport rules. As well, the Ministry negotiates on behalf of New Zealand, bilateral and multilateral air services agreements and is the licensing authority for foreign international airlines operating services to and from New Zealand.

Additional

The Ministry also: 
administers, on behalf of the Minister, the contract with the Meteorological Service of New Zealand (Metservice) for the provision of public weather warnings and forecasts 
manages the Motor Vehicle Register (MVR) and revenue collection functions which includes the collection and refund of motor vehicle registration and licensing fees, road user charges and fuel excise duty, and the maintenance of the MVR. The New Zealand Transport Agency is contracted to provide these services under an agreement with the Secretary for Transport. 
has responsibility for the operation of the Milford Sound/Piopiotahi Airport, and oversees the Crown's interest in joint venture airports
administers transport legislation, rules and regulations
represents New Zealand at international fora
licenses all international airlines operating to and from New Zealand
 
The Ministry does not have a hands-on-role in daily traffic, aviation, rail or maritime matters.

Ministers of Transport
The following ministers have held the office of Minister of Transport.

Key

See also
Transport in New Zealand

References

Sources

External links 
 

Transport
Ministry of Transport
New Zealand Public Service departments